Geva Films (Sirtei Geva), or the Geva film studio and laboratory was one of the first film studios in Israel. It produced newsreels for cinemas and short films, as well as feature films.

Its building was demolished in September 2011 and two residential towers (Geva Towers) were built in its place.

Produced films
 1956 – ":he:מעשה במונית", comedy, black-and-white 
 1959 – ":he:עמוד האש (סרט)"
1960: I Like Mike
1962: :he:חבורה שכזאת
 1963 – El Dorado 
 1963 – ":he:חבורה שכזאת"
 1964 – ":he:שמונה בעקבות אחד (סרט קולנוע)"
 1964 – Dalia And The Sailors 
 1965 – Hole in the Moon 
 1965 – ":he:פיצוץ בחצות", 
 1966 – The Flying Matchmaker (Two Kuni Lemel), film musical

People
, a founder
 Yitzhak Agadati, a founder, brother of Baruch Agadati
Yosef Navon, a founder of the Geva Film Studios, director, cameraman and sound technician
, worked on the Geva Films' newssreels in late 1950s 
Amnon Salomon
Adi Talmor

References

Film organizations in Israel
Entertainment companies of Israel
Givatayim
Buildings and structures demolished in 2011
Demolished buildings and structures in Israel
Entertainment companies established in 1949